Molson Canadian is a brand of 5% abv lager beer  (4% in Ireland) brewed by Molson Brewing, the Canadian division of Molson Coors Brewing Company. The beer was introduced in 1959.

Awards
Molson Canadian has won several beer industry awards, including: 
Canadian Brewing Awards - 2006 Gold Medal ‘North American Style Lager’
World Beer Cup - 2002 Silver Medal
Monde Selection - 6 Time Gold Medal Distinction (1989, 1990, 1991, 1997, 2001 and 2002).

Mega Keg 
The "Molson Canadian Mega Keg" is the world's largest monument to a keg of Molson Canadian. The monument measures 11 metres (36.5 feet) by five metres (16.5 feet), or roughly the height of a three-story building.

The monument was revealed to winners of a contest themed around the Mega Keg in September 2008. Were it a real keg, the Mega Keg monument would be large enough to hold the equivalent volume of over 500,000 cans of Molson Canadian.

Molson Canadian contracted Mississauga, Ontario-based Kubik to design and construct the massive monument.

Molson Canadian Sub-Zero

Molson Canadian Sub Zero is Molson Canadian served at temperatures below freezing (0C or 32F).

Molson Canadian Red Leaf Project
The Molson Canadian Red Leaf Project is an environmental platform that was introduced in 2011, which saw 100,000 trees planted in locations across Canada, in addition to park clean-up efforts in ten cities.

National Hockey League 
In February 2011 Molson entered a partnership with the National Hockey League, however, a series of court rulings delayed the beginning of the partnership until the opening night of the 2011–12 season on October 6.

The $375-million deal, which runs seven years, reportedly includes the following expenditures: approximately $100-million for the rights, $100-million in guaranteed advertising buys, and $100-million in so-called activation, which includes costs for the events and special promotions staged by Molson to capitalize on its rights.

References

External links
 Molson.com
 Canadian site 
 U.S. site

Canadian beer brands
Products introduced in 1959
Molson Coors brands